Charlotte Douglas may refer to:
Charlotte Douglas International Airport
Charlotte Douglas (author), co-author of The Battle of Betazed
Charlotte Douglas (physician) (1894–1979), Scottish physician and campaigner for improved maternity services in Scotland
Charlotte Douglas (politician) (born 1952), member of the Arkansas House of Representatives

Douglas, Charlotte